Rafael Savério Gatti, or Gatti (born in São Carlos on September 5, 1984), is a former Brazilian football goalkeeper.

Career
Stood to defend the Cabofriense during the Carioca championship in 2007, being voted best goalkeeper of the competition. Cabofriense (Loan) 5 December 2008 to 31 December 2008. Cruzeiro 1 January 2007 to 31 March 2009.

In 2013, Gatti hits with Volta Redonda to the Dispute and the Carioca Championship Season 2013.

Honours
Campeonato Mineiro: 2004

Personal honours
 Best goalkeeper of the Campeonato Carioca: 2007

External links
 CBF
 Guardian Stats Centre
 zerozero.pt
 soccerterminal
 Goleiro Gatti é reintegrado ao elenco celeste

1984 births
Living people
People from São Carlos
Footballers from São Paulo (state)
Brazilian footballers
Rio Branco Esporte Clube players
Cruzeiro Esporte Clube players
Associação Desportiva Cabofriense players
Brasiliense Futebol Clube players
Brazilian people of Italian descent
Association football goalkeepers
Cuiabá Esporte Clube players